In algebra and logic, a modal algebra is a structure  such that
 is a Boolean algebra,
Modal algebras provide models of propositional modal logics in the same way as Boolean algebras are models of classical logic. In particular, the variety of all modal algebras is the equivalent algebraic semantics of the modal logic K in the sense of abstract algebraic logic, and the lattice of its subvarieties is dually isomorphic to the lattice of normal modal logics.

Stone's representation theorem can be generalized to the Jónsson–Tarski duality, which ensures that each modal algebra can be represented as the algebra of admissible sets in a modal general frame.

A Magari algebra (or diagonalizable algebra) is a modal algebra satisfying . Magari algebras correspond to provability logic.

See also
Interior algebra
Heyting algebra

References
A. Chagrov and M. Zakharyaschev, Modal Logic, Oxford Logic Guides vol. 35, Oxford University Press, 1997. 

Modal logic
Boolean algebra